Victor M. Gover (1908–1970) was a British film director.

Partial filmography
 The Curse of the Wraydons (1946)
 King of the Underworld (1952)
 Murder at Scotland Yard (1952)

References

External links
 

1908 births
1970 deaths
Film directors from London